MS Xpedition is a cruise ship for Celebrity Cruises and one of three vessels making up the Xpedition class. The ship is an alternative to the line's larger ships, offering more personal attention afforded by its smaller size.

The ship currently sails to the Galápagos Islands, revisiting the ports of Charles Darwin. The ship's shallow draft allows it to access ports in the region that larger cruise ships cannot visit.

Incidents
On 5 November 2019 Celebrity Xpedition ran aground in the Galapagos Islands. No passengers or crew were injured and no environmental damage was caused.

References

External links
Official website

Ships of Celebrity Cruises
Expedition cruising
Ships built in Emden
2001 ships